Kentucky Route 1143 (KY 1143) is a  state highway in Kentucky maintained by the Kentucky Transportation Cabinet (KYTC).

Route description 
KY 1143 starts at an interchange with U.S. Route 460 (US 460) and US 460 Bypass near Great Crossing. Shortly after, it intersects Betsy Way to provide access to Great Crossing High School. It then runs through a rural area until its terminus at KY 32. It is primarily used by Scott County Schools, and Toyota.

Future 
There is currently construction to provide an expansion to KY 1143, which starts at its terminus at KY 32, adding a roundabout and then continues northbound to connect to KY 620, US 25, and Interstate 75 at exit 129.

Major Intersections

References 

Transportation in Scott County, Kentucky
1143
Georgetown, Kentucky